The 3rd Standing Committee of the Workers' Party of Korea (WPK),(3차 조선로동당 상임위원회) officially the Standing Committee of the 3rd Congress of the Workers' Party of Korea, was elected by the 1st Plenary Session of the 3rd Central Committee on 29 April 1956.

Members

References

Citations

Bibliography
Books:
 
 
  

Dissertations:
 

3rd Standing Committee of the Workers' Party of Korea
1956 establishments in North Korea
1961 disestablishments in North Korea